The 2015–16 Northern Colorado Bears men's basketball team represented the University of Northern Colorado during the 2015–16 NCAA Division I men's basketball season. The Bears were led by sixth-year head coach B. J. Hill and played their home games at Bank of Colorado Arena. They were a member of the Big Sky Conference. The Bears finished the season 10–21, 7–11 in Big Sky play to finish in ninth place. They lost to Portland State in the first round of the Big Sky tournament.

On April 21, 2016, the school fired head coach B. J. Hill amid an NCAA investigation into "serious and concerning" allegations of violations within the program. On May 1, the school hired Jeff Linder as head coach.

Previous season
The Bears finished the 2014–15 season 15–15, 10–8 in Big Sky play to finish in fifth place. They lost in the quarterfinals of the Big Sky tournament to Northern Arizona.

Departures

Incoming Transfers

2015 incoming recruits

2016 incoming recruits

Roster

Schedule

|-
!colspan=9 style="background:#000066; color:#FFCC33;"| Non-conference regular season

|-
!colspan=9 style="background:#000066; color:#FFCC33;"| Big Sky regular season

|-
!colspan=9 style="background:#000066; color:#FFCC33;"| Big Sky tournament

References

Northern Colorado Bears men's basketball seasons
Northern Colorado
Northern Colorado Bears men's basketball
Northern Colorado Bears men's basketball